The Timor blue flycatcher (Eumyias hyacinthinus) is a species of bird in the family Muscicapidae.
It is found on Timor island.
Its natural habitats are subtropical or tropical moist lowland forests and subtropical or tropical moist montane forests.

References

Timor blue flycatcher
Birds of Timor
Timor blue flycatcher
Taxonomy articles created by Polbot